Reverse flow may refer to:

In engine technology a reverse flow cylinder head is one that locates the intake and exhaust ports on the same side of the engine.
Reverse logistics, i.e. goods/waste flowing in the distribution network having consumers as point of origin
Reverse electron flow is a mechanism in microbial metabolism
In fluid mechanics, a fluid-flow phenomenon often associated with flow separation

See also 
 List of rivers that have reversed direction